Patrick (released internationally as Patrick: Evil Awakens) is a 2013 Australian supernatural horror film directed by Mark Hartley and a remake of the 1978 film of the same name. It had its world premiere on 27 July 2013 at the Melbourne International Film Festival and received a limited theatrical release on 14 March 2014, followed by a DVD release the following month. Its Canadian theatrical premiere was at the Lost Episode Festival Toronto on 5 July 2014.

The movie stars Jackson Gallagher as the titular Patrick, a comatose young man who uses his psychic powers to stalk a nurse caring for him.

Plot

Kathy, a young nurse, is eager to prove herself in her new job in an isolated psychiatric clinic. She's intrigued by Patrick, a comatose patient whom her boss Dr. Roget assures her is incapable of truly responding to any external stimuli. Kathy is horrified by the experiments that Roget and his nurse Matron Cassidy inflict upon him, and she's initially pleased when she finds a way to communicate with him. This quickly turns to horror when Patrick uses his psychic abilities to interfere with her life outside of the hospital, as Patrick has grown obsessed with Kathy and will harm anyone he deems to be interfering with his relationship with her.

Cast
Sharni Vinson as Kathy Jacquar
Rachel Griffiths as Matron Cassidy
Charles Dance as Doctor Roget
Peta Sergeant as Nurse Williams
Eliza Taylor as Nurse Panicale
Martin Crewes as Brian Wright
Damon Gameau as Ed Penhaligon
Jackson Gallagher as Patrick
Rod Mullinar as Morris
Simone Buchanan as Patrick's Mother

Production

Richard E. Grant was originally cast as the doctor but had to drop out because of a scheduling conflict.

Release

Home media
Patrick was released on DVD and Blu-ray by Phase 4 Films on June 10, 2014.

Reception 
On review aggregator Rotten Tomatoes, Patrick holds an approval rating of 73% based on 22 reviews, and an average rating of 5.30/10. On Metacritic, the film has a weighted average score of 48 out of 100 based on 4 critic reviews, indicating "mixed or average reviews".

The Hollywood Reporter rated it favorably, summing it up with the tagline "This Ozploitation remake is a spookily effective fright-fest." The Guardian gave a predominantly favorable but mixed review, praising the cast's acting overall while noting that the film erred in overdoing the film's shocks and doing them too early. Richard Kuipers from Variety gave the film a positive review, praising Vinson's performance, gothic atmosphere, while noting the film's occasionally wobbly dialogue. Drew Tinnin from Dread Central rated the film a score of 3.5 out of 5, stating that director Hartley "his remake of one of those films exhibits the same understanding of how to craft an effective horror film that's decidedly over-the-top while still retaining the same atmosphere that made the original Patrick worth documenting in the first place."

Clifford Wheatley from IGN wrote, "Patrick: Evil Awakens offers some talented actors doing their best with lacklustre material, peppered with some amusing practical make-up effects, but offers nothing of substance to make this a movie worth spending your money on. It's late-night cable fodder at the very best." Simon Abrams on Roger Ebert.com awarded the film a mixed 2.5 out of 4 stars, commending the film's score, script; while criticizing the film's dialogue, and direction as being "often unnecessarily over-determined".

Accolades

References

External links
 
 
 
 

2013 films
Films directed by Mark Hartley
2013 horror films
2010s supernatural horror films
Australian supernatural horror films
2010s English-language films
Fictional telekinetics
Films about telekinesis
Films set in Melbourne
Films scored by Pino Donaggio
Horror film remakes